Wild coffee is a common name for several plants and may refer to:

Coffea, coffee plants when growing outside of cultivation
Diospyros whyteana, native to Africa and cultivated as an ornamental
Polyscias guilfoylei, a tropical plant cultivated as an ornamental
Psychotria, a genus related to Coffea with a broad tropical distribution 
Psychotria nervosa, native to Florida
Triosteum perfoliatum, an herbaceous plant native to North America which has been used as a coffee substitute